Mezőberény is a town in Békés county, Hungary.

Location
Mezőberény is located in the Great Hungarian Plain, 200 km southeast from Budapest. Highway 46, 47 and  Budapest-Szolnok-Békéscsaba-Lökösháza high speed (120–160 km/h (75–99 mph)) railway line also cross the town.

History
The Medieval village of Berény was ruined due to the Ottoman wars, native Hungarian population fled from the area. It was rebuilt in the 18th century with German, Hungarian and Slovak settlers and was a multiethnic town until the late 19th century, when Germans and Slovaks adopted the Hungarian language. In 1881, the town had a population of 11,368 people, of which 4,267 were Slovaks, 3,860 Hungarians, 2,614 Germans and 627 of other ethnicites.

Notable people

Soma Orlai Petrich (1822–1880), painter

Twin towns – sister cities

Mezőberény is twinned with:
 Gronau, Germany
 Kolárovo, Slovakia
 Münsingen, Germany
 Sovata, Romania

References

External links

 (in Hungarian)
Guide Mezőberény (in Hungarian)

Populated places in Békés County